The 2015 AFF U-19 Youth Championship was an international football tournament that was held in Laos from 22 August until 4 September. The 10 national teams involved in the tournament were required to register a squad of 23 players; only players in these squads are eligible to take part in the tournament.

Group A

Head coach: Anurak Srikerd

Cambodia
Head coach: Hok Sochivorn

Brunei
Head coach:  Kwon Oh-son

Philippines
Head coach: Dan Padernal

Laos

Group B

Malaysia
Head coach: Hassan Sazali Waras

Myanmar
Head coach:  Gerd Friedrich

Singapore
Head coach:  Inoue Takuya

Timor-Leste
Head coach:  Takuma Koga

Vietnam
Head coach: Hoàng Anh Tuấn

References

AFF U-19 Youth Championship
Association football tournament squads